Robert Paris Taylor  (c 1741–1792) was a British administrator and  politician who sat in the House of Commons from 1768 to 1774.
 
Taylor was the son of  Peter Taylor of Burcott, Somerset and his wife Jane Holt. Through his father's connections, he was appointed to a position in the paymaster's office and in 1759 became Deputy Paymaster in Germany. He returned with a large fortune.
     
In 1765 Taylor was recommended as a candidate for Ilchester   because he could sustain the expense, but he did not get the seat. He was High Sheriff of Somerset in 1765–6. At the  1768 general election he was returned unopposed as Member of Parliament for Berwick-upon-Tweed. He did not stand in 1774. 
  
Taylor succeeded his father in 1777 but by then he appears to have been in serious financial difficulties. He was embroiled in litigation with the trustees of Lord Holland's estate over the accounts of  the paymaster's office. He was imprisoned  for debt  in Fleet prison where he passed the last twelve years of his life.  He died 7 Aug. 1792.

References

1740s births
1792 deaths
Members of the Parliament of Great Britain for English constituencies
British MPs 1768–1774
High Sheriffs of Somerset